Jeppe Kjær may refer to:
Jeppe Kjær (footballer, born 1985), Danish football forward
Jeppe Kjær (footballer, born 2004), Danish football winger